The Guam Department of Parks and Recreation (DPR) operates public parks in Guam. The agency has its headquarters in Agana Heights.

Properties 
In February 2021, DPR had 78 properties in its inventory, including parks, public cemeteries, and public pools. Of these, DPR Director Roke Alcantara Sr. stated 15 were being maintained by village mayors, 23 had been adopted by private firms, and 16 were not being maintained at all.

DPR properties include:
 Chinese Park, Upper Tumon
 Skate Park, Dededo
 Gov. Joseph Flores Beach Park, Ypao Tumon (Hilton Side)
 Gov. Joseph Flores Beach Park, Ypao Tumon  (GVB Side)
 Padre Palomo Memorial Beach Park, Hagåtña 
 Paseo Guerrero Field, Hagåtña
 Senator Angel Santos Memorial Park, Hagåtña
 Fort Santa Agueda, Agana Heights 
 Tepugan (Fish Eye) Beach Park, Piti
 Nimitz Beach Park, Agat
 Fort Soledad, Umatac 
 Saulaglula (Inarajan) Pool Park, Inarajan 
 Talofofo Beach Park, Ipan Talofofo 
 Ipan Beach Park, Ipan Talofofo
 Matapang Beach
 Agana Central Pool
 GHURA 506 Basketball Court and greenspace, Yigo
 Hagåtña Central Park tennis court
 Paseo de Susana Park basketball court
 Tamuning Basketball court

References

External links
 Guam Department of Parks and Recreation

Government of Guam